East Town Mall is an enclosed shopping mall owned by Lexington Realty International and Case Equity Partners, in Green Bay, Wisconsin in the United States. It is the only enclosed shopping mall within the city of Green Bay.

History
A mall on the east side of Green Bay was first proposed in 1980 by Dayton-Hudson Properties. The original name of the mall was the East Towne Fashion Square, and was planned as a 575,000 square foot shopping mall. Economic uncertainty in the early 1980s contributed to the scaling down of the mall project by about half of the planned size.

East Town Mall opened in October 1982 by the Center Companies. It was the third shopping mall in the Green Bay area. Original anchors included Kohl's (on the east side where Hobby Lobby currently resides) and Prange Way. Other original stores included Braun's Fashions, Maurices, The Athlete's Foot, Radioshack, and Regis Salon.

In 1995, Prange Way closed following the bankruptcy of the company. Soon after, Kohl's moved across the mall into the former Prange Way space. A remodel of the mall took place shortly after, creating space for a new Office Max out of the west side courtyard and vacant retail space. The mall was expanded to create a new corridor to connect to the new Kohl's location, creating new retail space.

The mall enjoyed new success in the late 1990s, as Hobby Lobby took over the old Kohl's anchor location, and Toy Works, Schlotzsky's, and Fashion Bug opened new locations in the mall. A new Budget Cinema was also carved out of several vacant spaces at the back end of the mall.

In 2007, Cabot Investment Properties purchased the mall for $12 million.

In 2010, the mall was given a new front entryway and street signs. The interior of the mall and the center court were also renovated. Seven Windspire Energy wind turbines were added to the front plaza, which helps to reduce the energy costs of the mall.

In 2017, Silver Cinemas closed their East Town Mall location.

Ponzi scheme

In 2014, Massachusetts Secretary of the Commonwealth William Galvin filed fraud charges against Cabot Investment Properties, accusing them of operating a ponzi scheme. In the preceding years, the owners of Cabot Investment Properties had embezzled over $9 million. Local investors, many of whom were retired or elderly, had each paid $213,000 for a three percent ownership stake in the mall, which was then lost due to embezzlement.

After Cabot Investment Properties defaulted, the court placed the mall in receivership, with Jones Lang LaSalle being appointed as the receiving owner.

Redevelopment
In 2016, Lexington Realty International and Case Equity Partners purchased East Town Mall, and plan to redevelop the mall into a regional power center. The renovation, which would total $12 million, was approved by the Green Bay City Council on November 14, 2016. Planned tenants included a Fresh Thyme Farmers Market grocery store and a new branch of the Brown County Library. In 2021, local developer Garritt Bader announced plans to redevelop 14 acres of the property with a mix of retail stores and the development of production and industrial warehouse facilities.

Anchors
Hobby Lobby
Kohl's
Petco

References

Buildings and structures in Brown County, Wisconsin
Shopping malls in Wisconsin
Shopping malls established in 1982
1982 establishments in Wisconsin